The Marosakabe cave system is a cave in Marosalaza region, Madagascar, the longest in Africa.

The cave is situated in northwestern part of Madagascar in the Mahajanga Province in Namoroka National Park, in a Tsingy area. 
It is characterized by an extremely high number of fractures, with very pure jurassic limestone, and the void density is very high.

The cave has been explored since 2008 under the coordination of Jean-Nicolas Delaty and Eric Sibert. After 11 expeditions in the remote area, 113km of cave passages have been explored and surveyed (as of 2018), making it the longest cave in Africa and 23rd longest in the world.

References

See also
List of longest caves

Caves of Boeny